William Loraine may refer to:

Sir William Loraine, 2nd Baronet (1658-1744), of the Loraine Baronets, MP for Northumberland (UK Parliament constituency) 
Sir William Loraine, 4th Baronet (1749-1809), of the Loraine Baronets
Sir William Loraine, 6th Baronet (1801-1849), of the Loraine Baronets
Sir William Loraine, 9th Baronet (1780-1851), of the Loraine Baronets